Fangio is a given name and surname. Notable people with the name include:

Fangio Buyse (born 1974), Belgian footballer
Francesca Fangio (born 1995), Italian swimmer
Juan Manuel Fangio (1911–1995), Argentine racing car driver
Juan Manuel Fangio II (born 1956), Argentine racing car driver
Vic Fangio (born 1958), American football coach